Head Hunters is a British television game show produced by Tuesday's Child Television for the BBC. It is hosted by Rob Beckett. The programme was first broadcast on BBC One from 7 October 2019 to 15 November 2019, and was transmitted at 14:15 on weekdays. A rerun of the first series began airing at 1pm on 22 September 2021.

References

External links
 
 
 

2010s British game shows
2019 British television series debuts
2019 British television series endings
BBC television game shows
English-language television shows